Earl Warren High School is a public school located in San Antonio, Texas, United States. It is a part of the Northside Independent School District. As with all Northside ISD high schools, it is named for a former United States Supreme Court justice - in this case, former Chief Justice Earl Warren. When the school opened, the Warren family donated the robe worn by Earl Warren during the historic Brown v. Board of Education case. The robe is displayed in the school’s front office.

In 2017, the school was rated "Met Standard" by the Texas Education Agency, with a 3-Star Distinction for Academic Achievements in Mathematics, Top 25 Percent Student Progress, and Top 25 Percent Closing Performance Gaps.

In 2006, the Warren Academic Decathlon Team made it to state competition for the first time.

Northside ISD magnet school Construction Careers Academy was founded in 2009 with an academic focus on construction related skills, and is located on the Warren campus.

On Friday, November 4, 2005, only about 400 of Warren's 3,000 students attended school for the entire day due to threatening messages posted on MySpace; specifically that “two boys were planning to show up at school with guns." The four students who posted the messages on the web site were identified by administrators as “current students of Warren High School”, and faced felony charges, including making terroristic threats and disruption of a high school campus.

Athletics 

The Warren Warriors baseball and football teams made it to the playoffs in 2006 for the first time in school history. In 2008 the football team went (9-3) and won the first district championship (28-5A) in school history.

Soccer
The boys varsity soccer team made it to the playoffs five years in a row after 2006, and made it to the regional tournament in 2006 and 2009, taking down one of the best teams in the Northeast Independent School District, Churchill. The soccer team went undefeated in 2007 before losing to Lee in the second round of playoffs. In 2011 the soccer team took down the number one ranked Reagan Rattlers in the area playoffs, and then beat the Cibolo-Steele Knights in the regional quarterfinals.

Notable alumni
 Tony Crocker (Class of 2005) – professional basketball player
 Marcus Keene (Class of 2013) – professional basketball player
 Darryl Morris (Class of 2008) – professional football player in the NFL
 Taurean Prince (Class of 2012) – professional basketball player in the NBA
 Maxi Rodriguez (Class of 2013) – professional soccer player for Detroit City FC
 Stanley Umude (Class of 2017), professional basketball player in the NBA
 Ben Uzoh (Class of 2006) – professional basketball player in the NBA and in foreign leagues

References

External links 
 Northside Independent School District
 Earl Warren High School
 Earl Warren High School Warrior Band
 Construction Careers Academy

High schools in San Antonio
Public high schools in Bexar County, Texas
Northside Independent School District high schools
2003 establishments in Texas
Educational institutions established in 2003